Group 6 was the official designation applied by the FIA to two motor racing classifications, the Prototype-Sports Car category from 1966 to 1971 and the Two-Seater Racing Cars class from 1976 to 1982.

Group 6 Prototype-Sports Cars (1966 to 1971)

The original Group 6 was introduced for the 1966 racing season, at the same time as a new Group 4 Sports Car category. Whilst Group 4 specified that competing cars must be one of at least fifty examples built, Group 6 had no minimum production requirement. Nor did it have a maximum engine capacity limit although there were weight, dimensional and other restrictions placed on the Group 6 cars.  The Prototypes and  Sports Cars categories each had their own international championships to fight for but many of the major international endurance races such as the 24 Hours of Le Mans would count as qualifying rounds for both championships.

1968 saw a three-litre engine capacity limit imposed on the Group 6 category and the dual championship format was replaced by a single International Championship for Makes open to both Group 6 and Group 4 cars. The Le Mans 24 Hour retained its place as a championship round. For 1969 the FIA relaxed a number of Group 6 regulations relating to weight, spare wheel, windscreen height and luggage space requirements.

For 1972 the Group 6 Prototype-Sports Car class was redesignated and renamed to become the Group 5 Sports Car category. The International Championship of Makes became the World Championship of Makes and the first chapter of Group 6 history was brought to a close by the FIA.

Group 6 cars had been eligible to compete in 24 Hours of Le Mans each year from 1966 to 1971; however, the category had produced the outright winning car only in 1966 and 1967.

Group 6 Two-Seater Racing Cars (1976 to 1982)

In 1976, the FIA reintroduced the Group 6 classification, now officially called “Two- Seater Racing Cars”.

Various production-based categories, spearheaded by a new Group 5 for “Special Production Cars”, were now to contest the World Championship of Makes whilst the Group 6 cars were awarded their own title, the World Championship for Sports Cars. Three engine capacity limits were applied to Group 6 cars for the 1976 and 1977 championships: 
 5000cc for cars fitted with engines using a production car block 
 3000cc for cars fitted with naturally aspirated racing engines 
 2140cc for cars fitted with turbocharged racing engines  (capacity equivalence factor of 1.4)

After two years of small fields and little in the way of manufacturer support the championship was downgraded to become the European Sports Car Championship for 1978 but even that title was to be abandoned after the first year. From 1979 the FIA decreed that Group 6 cars could compete in the World Championship of Makes qualifying rounds but continued to allow only production-based cars to score championship points for their manufacturer.

1981 saw the series expanded with an official Drivers’ title awarded by the FIA for the first time and drivers of Group 6 cars were eligible to compete for this. Group 6 was then effectively replaced by the new Group C Sports Car class for 1982 but the FIA granted a concession which allowed the Group 6 cars to compete in the 1982 World Endurance Championship alongside the new cars. As in 1981, drivers of Group 6 cars were eligible to score points in the Drivers’ championship but the relevant manufacturers could not score points towards the Makes title.
For the 1982 World Endurance Championship, the engine capacity maximum for Group 6 cars was set at 3000cc.

Throughout the seven years of the second era of Group 6 racing the cars had been eligible to compete in 24 Hours of Le Mans and the category had produced the outright winning car in all years except 1979 & 1982.

Groups 1-9

References

 
Racing car classes
Fédération Internationale de l'Automobile